Cecil Frederick Pike (26 February 1898 – 12 May 1968) was a British politician.

Born in Bromley, Kent, after studying at Owens College in Manchester, Pike joined the Conservative Party.  He stood unsuccessfully for the party in Rother Valley at the 1929 general election.  He moved to contest Sheffield Attercliffe at the 1931 election.  Although this was usually a safe Labour Party seat, he was able to win by just 165 votes.  He was heavily defeated at the 1935 election, and was also unsuccessful at the 1939 Colne Valley by-election. He died in Chesterfield, Derbyshire aged 70.

References
Michael Stenton and Stephen Lees, Who's Who of British MPs: Volume III, 1919-1945

External links 
 

1898 births
1968 deaths
Politics of Sheffield
Conservative Party (UK) MPs for English constituencies
UK MPs 1931–1935